The 5th Saturn Awards were awarded to media properties and personalities deemed by the Academy of Science Fiction, Fantasy and Horror Films to be the best in science fiction, fantasy and horror released in the year 1977. It was held on January 14, 1978, and taped for television broadcast under the title Science Fiction Film Awards, which aired on January 21, 1978. This was the first ceremony in which the nominees for the acting categories were more than just a single individual while the category Best Editing was introduced. The event was hosted by Karen Black and William Shatner.

Star Wars won the most awards with 13 wins (7 competitive; 6 special), including Best Science Fiction Film, Best Director (George Lucas) and Best Writing (Lucas), followed by Close Encounters of the Third Kind, The Little Girl Who Lives Down the Lane, and Oh, God! with two wins each.

This ceremony is also notable for when Shatner performed a spoken word rendition of the song "Rocket Man", introduced by Bernie Taupin.

Winners and nominees
Below is a complete list of nominees and winners. Winners are highlighted in boldface.

References

External links
 1978 Awards at IMDb
 Science Fiction Film Awards
 Official Saturn Awards website

Saturn Awards ceremonies
Saturn
1978 in California
Saturn